Fine Collection: Begin Again (stylized FINE COLLECTION 〜Begin Again〜) is a Japanese compilation album by South Korean pop duo Tohoshinki. It was released on October 25, 2017 through Avex Trax as a complementary album for their comeback Japanese concert the Begin Again Tour, the duo's first tour since completing their military service. The album mainly contains singles released by Tohoshinki since 2011, including tracks from the albums Tone (2011), Time (2013), Tree (2014), and With (2015). The album also includes three re-recorded versions of earlier singles.

Begin Again was first announced by Avex Trax in August 2017 and was released in four physical versions: Version A, a CD+Blu-ray version which includes 23 music video clips; Version B, a CD+DVD version which also includes 23 music video clips; Version C, a CD-only version; and Version D, a fan club limited edition that includes exclusive footage from the concert.

The album was a commercial success, debuting at number one on the Billboard Japan Top Albums Chart and the Oricon Albums Chart, selling 130,000 copies on the first week of release. In doing so, Tohoshinki became the foreign act with the most number one albums in Japan. Begin Again has earned a gold certification by the Recording Industry Association of Japan (RIAJ) for shipments of over 100,000 copies.

Background and release
The album was put in production soon after Tohoshinki's discharges from the Republic of Korea Armed Forces in late 2017. The songs "Rising Sun" (2006), "Dōshite Kimi o Suki ni Natte Shimattandarō?" (2008), and "Bolero" (2009), numbers the duo performed in their last concert tour With Tour (2015), were re-recorded for the album. Begin Again, a title inspired by Tohoshinki's 2006 single "Begin" (Five in the Black), was announced on August 22, 2017 through their official Avex Trax website. The album was marked as a commemorative and complementary release for the duo's comeback concert tour, Begin Again. To promote the album, Meet & Greet tickets were attached to each album, and buyers had to register their serial numbers through Tohoshinki's official website to be chosen. 220 fans were chosen for the Meet & Greet events, which were held at each Begin Again tour venue.

Commercial performance
According to statistics compiled by Japan's Oricon, Begin Again topped the daily Oricon Albums Chart on its first day of release, selling 81,791 copies. It stayed on top of the daily Oricon Albums Chart the next three days, selling an additional 40,449 copies. By the end of the week, Begin Again sold 134,447 copies and was the number one album of the week. Begin Again also debuted atop the Billboard Japan Top Albums Chart and Japan Hot Albums chart. It ranked third on the Billboard Japan Albums Download Chart.

Begin Again is the duo's sixth consecutive record to top the Oricon Albums Chart, breaking Simon & Garfunkel and Bon Jovi's record as the foreign male music act with the most consecutive number-one albums in Japan. Tohoshinki are also the first foreign music act in Japan to top the weekly Oricon Albums Chart six times.

Track listing

Notes
Version D is only available on the Bigeast Official Shop, which requires Bigeast membership.

Sales and certifications

References

External links
 [toho-jp.net/special/beginagain/ Tohoshinki Begin Again special website]

2017 compilation albums
TVXQ albums
Avex Group albums
Japanese-language albums